The Göta Engineer Regiment, designation Ing 2, is a Swedish Army engineer regiment that traces its origins back to the 19th century.  It is still in active service, and is currently garrisoned in Eksjö.

History 
The regiment has its origins in the Sapper Battalion raised between 1873 and 1878.  The battalion changed its name in 1893 to the Göta Engineer Battalion, and in 1902 to the Göta Engineer Corps, when it gained the designation Ing 2 (2nd Engineer Regiment). The Göta Engineer Corps was upgraded to a regiment in 1963 and was renamed Göta ingenjörregemente.

It was then downgraded to a battalion unit again in 1994, but six years later in 2000 it was upgraded to a regiment, and regained its old name. The regiment was garrisoned in Stockholm, Karlsborg before it moved to Eksjö in 1928 where it is currently garrisoned.

Campaigns 
None

Units

Current units
21st Engineer Battalion (21. ingenjörbataljonen) is one of the Göta Engineer Regiment's war units. The battalion includes four companies with different orientations; 211th Staff and Support Company (211. stab- och trosskompaniet), 212th Engineer Company (212. ingenjörkompaniet), 213th Machine/Bridge Company (213. maskin/brokompaniet) and the 214th Engineer Company (214. ingenjörkompaniet). The main task of the engineer battalion is to support the combat battalions' battle with field work for mobility, for example mine reconnaissance and mine clearance, and the establishment of temporary connections. Other tasks include fieldwork for survival or other fieldwork such as fortification and munitions clearance. The battalion is equipped with, among other things, the AEV 3 Kodiak (Ingenjörbandvagn 120), the BvS 10, the Patria Pasi and splitter-protected machines. The battalion must be able to carry out qualified field works at all levels of conflict in and outside Sweden. The battalion consists of professional officers and reserve officers. A large part of the soldiers in the 21st Engineer Battalion are full-time employees, but there are also part-time employees serving during exercises and operations. The soldiers have a variety of functions such as general engineering service, ammunition clearing, bridging systems, staff support, maintenance service, medical service, technical service and as driver of heavy vehicles and machines. In addition, there are part-time civilians, mainly doctors and nurses.

22nd Engineer Battalion (22. ingenjörbataljonen) is one of the Göta Engineer Regiment's war units. The battalion includes four companies with different orientations; 221st Staff and Support Company (221. stab- och trosskompaniet), 222nd Engineer Company (222. ingenjörkompaniet), 223rd Machine/Bridge Company (223. maskin/brokompaniet) and the 224th Engineer Company (224. ingenjörkompaniet). The main task of the engineer battalion is to support the combat battalions' battle with field work for mobility, for example mine reconnaissance and mine clearance, and the establishment of temporary connections. Other tasks include fieldwork for survival or other fieldwork such as fortification and munitions clearance. The battalion is equipped with, among other things, the AEV 3 Kodiak (Ingenjörbandvagn 120), the BvS 10, the Patria Pasi and splitter-protected machines. The battalion must be able to carry out qualified field works at all levels of conflict in and outside Sweden. The battalion consists of professional officers and reserve officers. The soldiers in the 22nd Engineer Battalion are mainly part-time employees who serve during exercises and operation. The soldiers have a variety of functions such as general engineering service, ammunition clearing, bridging systems, staff support, maintenance service, medical service, technical service and as driver of heavy vehicles and machines. In addition, there are part-time civilians, mainly doctors and nurses.

33rd Home Guard Battalion (33. hemvärnsbataljonen) also called the Northern Småland Battalion (Norra Smålandsbataljonens) is a Home Guard battalion whose area includes Jönköping County. The majority of all personnel in the unit are resident in the catchment area. The battalion belongs to the Göta Engineer Regiment (Ing 2). The battalion include to a pioneer platoon, the first of the four existing ones raised. The platoon can carry out a variety of forms of field work, including mine reconnaissance, fortification work, blasting, and building connections with military bridges. The battalion also has an aviation group that, with the help of smaller aircraft, gives the battalion invaluable intelligence via observations from the air. The aviation group can also make quick transports of personnel and important equipment. The unit has two associated music bands and its most important tasks are state ceremonial activities such as playing at the guard parade and the changing of the Royal Guards at Stockholm Palace. The battalion is administered and trained by the Northern Småland Group (Norra Smålandsgruppen), which is grouped with other military activities within Eksjö Garrison. The commanding officer of the Northern Småland Group is directly subordinate to the regimental commander of Göta Engineer Regiment (Ing 2). The current tasks of the Northern Småland Group are to train and administer Home Guard units in Jönköping County. The group will also support voluntary defense organizations and be prepared to lead operations to support society in general.

Swedish Army Field Work School (Fältarbetsskolan) is a part of Göta Engineer Regiment and is responsible for training engineer and pioneer officers for the operational organization, for tasks both nationally and internationally. The school also develops new field work equipment as well as new organizations and methods, primarily for the engineer battalions. The school also manages experimental activities regarding new equipment and organizations with the aim of developing future operational organizations.

Heraldry and traditions

Colours, standards and guidons
Göta Engineer Regiment presents one regimental colour and one traditional colour.

The 1935 colour
The traditional colour is drawn by Mrs Westberg and embroidered by hand in insertion technique by the company Libraria. The colour was presented to the then Royal Göta Engineer Corps (Ing 2) at the 300-years anniversary of the Fortifikationen ("Royal Engineers") in Stockholm by His Majesty the King Gustaf V on 26 September 1935. Blazon: "On blue cloth in the centre the lesser coat of arms of Sweden, three yellow crowns placed two and one. In the first corner a mullet with a cluster of rays, all yellow. In the lower part of the rays the coat-of-arms of the regiment; azure, on three bends wavy sinister argent, a crowned lion rampant or, armed gules. The shield ensigned with a royal crown proper."

The 2006 colour
A new colour was presented by Supreme Commander Håkan Syrén on 10 August 2006. The new colour has three crowns and the Göta Engineer Regiment's mark written on a black bottom, with the regiment's battle honours at the top of the colour. Previously, the regiment carried two colours. This was due to Ing 2 took over the colour of the Småland Regiment (I 12) at its disbandment on 30 June 2000. It was then carried parallel with the Göta Engineer Regiment's old colour. The battle honours on the new colour were taken over from Småland Regiment.

Coat of arms
The coat of the arms of the Göta Engineer Regiment (Ing 2) 1977–1994, the Göta Engineer Corps (Ing 2) 1994–2000 and Göta Engineer Regiment (Ing 2) since 2000. Blazon: "Azur, the regimental badge, three waves bendy-sinister argent, charged with a double-tailed crowned lion rampant or, armed and langued gules. The shield surmounted a cluster of rays coming down from a mullet, or".

Commanding officers
Regimental commanders active from 1878.

1878-1881: Major Hjalmar Stålhane
1881-1890: Lieutenant Colonel Wilhelm Stolpe
1890-1895: Major C.D. Ludvig W:son Munthe
1895-1898: Major Hans Ahlmann
1898-1903: Lieutenant Colonel Erik Gustaf Kinell
1903-1904: Major Broder Sten A:son Leijonhufvud
1904-1910: Lieutenant Colonel August Fredrik Thorsell
1910-1915: Colonel Gustaf Enblom
1915-1917: Lieutenant Colonel Ernst Adrian Eriksson
1917-1922: Lieutenant Colonel Fredrik Georg Rudman Bergenstråhle
1922-1926: Colonel Gustaf Julius Rabe
1926-1934: Colonel Sven Erik Bjuggren
1934-1937: Lieutenant Colonel Carl Anders Sigurd Rahmqvist
1937-1940: Lieutenant Colonel Åke Edward Grönhagen
1940-1941: Colonel Gunnar Edward Ström
1941-1946: Colonel Inge Gustaf Hellgren
1946-1947: Colonel Nils Fredrik Wilhelm Ekman
1947-1954: Colonel Helge Porse Robert Geete
1954-1957: Colonel Arne Mohlin
1957-1964: Colonel Björn Gustaf Adolf Berg
1964-1966: Colonel Gunnar Nordlöf
1966-1969: Colonel Erik Olof Sigvard Månsson
1969-1978: Colonel Lars Anders Andersson
1978-1980: Colonel Sten Ahlström
1980-1982: Colonel Sven-Erik Anton Nilsson
1982-1984: Colonel Lars-Åke Persson
1984-1990: Colonel Carl Gösta Edholm
1990-1992: Colonel Bertil Christer Ljung
1993-1997: Colonel Jan-Erik Björn Svensson
1997-2000: Colonel Karl Erik Lennart Bengtsson
2000-2003: Colonel Bengt Axelsson
2003-2006: Colonel Anders Stenström
2006-2011: Colonel Tommy Karlsson
2011-2013: Colonel Gustaf Fahl
2013–2016: Colonel Patrik Ahlgren
2016–2022: Colonel Michael Ginér
2022–present: Colonel Per Åkerblom

Names, designations and locations

See also
List of Swedish engineer regiments

Footnotes

References

Notes

Print

Web

Further reading

External links

 

Engineer regiments of Sweden
Military units and formations established in 1878
1878 establishments in Sweden
Stockholm Garrison
Karlsborg Garrison
Eksjö Garrison